U.S. Route 26 (US 26) is an east–west United States highway that runs from Seaside, Oregon to Ogallala, Nebraska. When the U.S. highway system was first defined, it was limited to Nebraska and Wyoming; by the 1950s, it continued into Idaho and Oregon. The highway's eastern terminus is in Ogallala, Nebraska at an intersection with Interstate 80. Its western terminus is south of Seaside, Oregon at an intersection with U.S. Route 101. Prior to 2004, the route's last 20 miles (32 km) were co-signed with U.S. Route 101 from the highways' junction south of Seaside north to Astoria where its intersection with U.S. Route 30 was also U.S. 30's western terminus. Long segments of the highway follow the historic Oregon Trail. At its peak, immediately before the establishment of the Interstate Highway System, US 26 was 1,557 miles (2506 km) in length, and terminated in Astoria, Oregon.

Route description

Oregon

Starting at a junction with U.S. Highway 101 near Seaside, Oregon, U.S. Highway 26 heads southeast through the Coast Range to Portland. In the western Portland area, US 26 is a freeway known as the Sunset Highway. After passing through the Vista Ridge Tunnel, heading into downtown Portland, it intersects with Interstate 405 and runs along the interstate southbound for about a half-mile before exiting onto surface streets at the waterfront, meeting Oregon Route 43 at Macadam Avenue before crossing Interstate 5.  After crossing the Willamette River and meeting at an incomplete interchange with Oregon Route 99E, US 26 then heads east on Powell Boulevard where it crosses Interstate 205 and continues east to Sandy on what is known as the Mount Hood Highway No. 26 (see Oregon Routes and Highways), a four-lane divided highway that was supposed to be the Mount Hood Freeway, which was never built just south of Division St.

After passing through Sandy, Highway 26 (known there as the Mount Hood Highway) continues on towards Government Camp and Bennett Pass, where it eventually meets up with Oregon Route 35. The Mount Hood Highway continues north along Oregon Route 35, while Highway 26 heads southeast towards Madras, where it intersects with U.S. Route 97. It then continues southeast to Prineville, where it meets Oregon Route 126 and heads east through John Day where it meets U.S. Route 20 in Vale. The remainder of Highway 26 follows U.S. Route 20 to the Idaho state line.

Idaho

From the Oregon state line, US 26 continues to follow US 20 to Boise, with short concurrencies with U.S. Highway 95 near Parma and Interstate 84 at Caldwell.  At Boise, US 26/US 20 merges with I-84 for about 40 miles until Mountain Home, where US 20 splits from US 26/I-84. About 41 miles later in Bliss, US 26 splits from I-84, joining US 93 at Shoshone with the concurrent routes joining US 20 at Carey. US 26/20/93 skirt the north edge of Craters of the Moon National Monument and then through Arco where US 93 splits north. Near Idaho National Engineering Laboratory, US. 26 again splits from US 20 to the southeast, proceeding to Blackfoot, where US 26 joins Interstate 15 for about 20 miles before splitting just south of Idaho Falls toward Alpine, Wyoming.

Wyoming

From Alpine, US 26 is co-signed with U.S. Route 89 east and north to Hoback Junction, then co-signed with US 89, U.S. Route 189, and U.S. Route 191 to Jackson. US 189 ends in Jackson, and the other three highways continue their concurrency through Grand Teton National Park up to Moran. At "Glacier View Turnout," a view of Teton Glacier, on the north of Grand Teton, can be seen. At Moran, US 26 turns east, concurrent with U.S. Route 287. Crossing the Continental Divide at Togwotee Pass, US 26 passes through Dubois, Wyoming, the end of the Wyoming Centennial Scenic Byway, and at Diversion Dam Junction, US 26 and US 287 separate; US 26 continues southeast to Riverton, then northeast to Shoshoni. From Shoshoni to Casper, US 26 is co-signed with U.S. Highway 20. US 20-26 has a bypass north of Casper, the eastern half of which is concurrent with Interstate 25 and U.S. Route 87. US 20-26-87 parallels I-25 from Casper to Glenrock; east of Glenrock, US 26 (along with US 20 and US 87) is co-signed on I-25. US 26 follows I-25 to Dwyer Junction, where it turns east to continue along the Old Oregon Trail. US 26 passes through Guernsey, Fort Laramie, Lingle, and Torrington before entering Nebraska. U.S. Route 85 is concurrent with US 26 between Lingle and Torrington.

Nebraska

US 26 runs southeastward parallel to the North Platte River. The largest city US 26 runs through in Nebraska is Scottsbluff, which is just 22 miles (35 km) from the Wyoming border.  US 26 also goes past the Chimney Rock National Historic Site. US 26 intersects with U.S. Highway 385 in Bridgeport and then continues to its eastern terminus in Ogallala, Nebraska at Interstate 80.  All told, there are 145 miles (233 km) of US 26 in the state of Nebraska.

History

U.S. Highway 320 (US 320) was part of the initial 1926 system, connecting US 20 in Shoshoni with US 87W in Riverton, Wyoming. It became WYO 320 in 1938, which was extended southwest to Lander in 1940 when US 287 (which had replaced US 87W) was realigned. The original part of US 320/WYO 320 became part of an extension of US 26 in 1950, and the rest of WYO 320 became part of WYO 789 in 1954.

Major intersections
Oregon
  south of Seaside
  in Portland. The highways travel concurrently through the city.
  in Portland
  in Madras. The highways travel concurrently through the city.
  in Mount Vernon. The highways travel concurrently to John Day.
  in Vale. The highways travel concurrently to Mountain Home.
Idaho
  north-northwest of Parma. The highways travel concurrently to southeast of Parma.
  north of Caldwell. The highways travel concurrently to Caldwell.
  in Boise. The highways travel concurrently through the city.
  in Boise. I-84/US 26 travel concurrently to Bliss. US 26/US 30 travel concurrently to west-northwest of Bliss.
  in Shoshone. The highways travel concurrently to Arco.
  in Carey. The highways travel concurrently to northwest of Atomic City.
  in Blackfoot. The highways travel concurrently to Idaho Falls.
  in Idaho Falls
Wyoming
  on the Alpine Northwest–Alpine Northeast line. The highways travel concurrently to Moran.
  in Hoback Junction. US 26/US 189 travel concurrently to Jackson. US 26/US 191 travel concurrently to Moran.
  in Moran. The highways travel concurrently to west-northwest of Morton.
  in Shoshoni. The highways travel concurrently to Orin.
  on the Casper–Hartrandt city line. I-25/US 26 travel concurrently into Casper proper. US 26/US 87 travel concurrently to west-southwest of Dwyer.
  southeast of Glenrock. The highways travel concurrently to west-southwest of Dwyer.
  in Orin
  in Lingle. The highways travel concurrently to Torrington.
Nebraska
  in Bridgeport. The highways travel concurrently to Northport.
  west of Ogallala. The highways travel concurrently to Ogallala.
  in Ogallala.

See also

 List of United States Numbered Highways
 U.S. Route 126

References

External links
 

 Endpoints of U.S. Highway 26

 
United States Numbered Highway System
U.S. Route 26
U.S. Highways in Wyoming